Burier railway station is a railway station in the municipality of La Tour-de-Peilz, in the Swiss canton of Vaud. It is an intermediate stop on the standard gauge Simplon line of Swiss Federal Railways.

Services 
 the following services stop at Burier:

References

External links 
 
 

Railway stations in the canton of Vaud
Swiss Federal Railways stations